Qizhou was a prefecture between the 5th and 8th centuries in modern Shaanxi, China

Prefectures of the Northern and Southern dynasties
Prefectures of the Tang dynasty